The 2015–16 TFF First League, also known as PTT First League due to sponsoring reasons, is the 15th season since the league was established in 2001 and 53rd season of the second-level football league of Turkey since its establishment in 1963–64.

Teams 
Balıkesir, Karabükspor and Kayseri Erciyesspor relegated from 2014–15 Süper Lig.
Kayserispor, Osmanlıspor and Antalyaspor promoted to 2015–16 Süper Lig.
Göztepe, Yeni Malatyaspor and 1461 Trabzon promoted from 2014–15 TFF Second League.
Manisaspor, Bucaspor and Orduspor relegated to 2015–16 TFF Second League.

Stadia and locations

League table

Results

Promotion Playoffs

Semifinals

Final

Attendance

See also 
 2015–16 Turkish Cup
 2015–16 Süper Lig
 2015–16 TFF Second League
 2015–16 TFF Third League

References

External links 
  Turkish Football Federation PTT 1. League

TFF First League seasons
Turkey
2015–16 in Turkish football